The Duluth Model which includes the Domestic Abuse Intervention Project or DAIP or Pence's model) is a model that brings agencies together to reduce domestic violence against women. It is named after Duluth, Minnesota, the city where it was developed. The model was largely founded by feminist Ellen Pence.

One part of this model is the men's behaviour change program 'Creating a Process of Change for Men who Batter' [also known as the Duluth Curriculum].  The Duluth Curriculum is the most common batterer intervention program used in the United States. Overall, the Duluth Model is successful because it is grounded in the experience of victims, helps offenders and society change, and pulls the whole community together to respond. However, some critics argued that it neglected male victims and female perpetrators of abuse.

Origin and theory
The feminist theory underlying the Duluth Model is that men use violence within relationships to exercise power and control. The curriculum "is designed to be used within a community using its institutions to diminish the power of batterers over their victims and to explore with each abusive man the intend and source of his violence and the possibilities for change through seeking a different kind of relationship with women”.
This is illustrated by the "Power and Control Wheel," a graphic typically displayed as a poster in participating locations. According to the Duluth Model, "women and children are vulnerable to violence because of their unequal social, economic, and political status in society." Treatment of abusive men is focused on re-education, as "we do not see men’s violence against women as stemming from individual pathology, but rather from a socially reinforced sense of entitlement." The program's philosophy is intended to help batterers work to change their attitudes and personal behavior so they would learn to be nonviolent in any relationship.

The Domestic Abuse Intervention Project was the first multi-agency program designed to address the issue of domestic violence. This experimental program, conducted in Duluth in 1981, coordinated the actions of a variety of agencies dealing with domestic conflict. The Duluth model curriculum was developed by a "small group of activists
in the battered women’s movement" with five battered women and four men as subjects. The program has become a model for programs in other jurisdictions seeking to deal more effectively with domestic violence.

Effectiveness

A U.S. study published in 2002 sponsored by the federal government found that batterers who complete programs based on the Duluth Model are less likely to repeat acts of domestic violence than those who do not complete any batterers' intervention program.

A 2003 study conducted by the U.S. National Institute of Justice found the Duluth Model to have "little or no effect." However, this study had considerable shortfalls. The National Institute of Justice said in its introduction, "...response rates were low, many people dropped out of the program, and victims could not be found for subsequent interviews. The tests used to measure batterers' attitudes toward domestic violence and their likelihood to engage in future abuse were of questionable validity."

A 2003 longitudinal, four-year evaluation by E W Gondolf, covering four cities, shows clear deescalation of reassault and other abuse, with 80% of men reaching sustained non-violence.

A 2005 study led by Larry Bennett, a professor of social work at the University of Illinois at Chicago and an expert on batterer intervention programs, found that of the 30 batterer intervention programs in Cook County, Illinois, 15 percent of batterers who completed the programs were rearrested for domestic violence, compared with 37 percent of those who dropped out of the programs. However, Bennett said the studies are largely meaningless because they lacked a proper control group. He added that participants who complete domestic violence programs are likely to be more motivated than others to improve behavior and would be less inclined to offend again.

A 2011 review of the effectiveness of batterers intervention programs (BIP) (primarily Duluth Model) found that "there is no solid empirical evidence for either the effectiveness or relative superiority of any of the current group interventions," and that "the more rigorous the methodology of evaluation studies, the less encouraging their findings." That is, as BIPs in general, and Duluth Model programs in particular are subject to increasingly rigorous review, their success rate approaches zero.

A 2014 news report reported zero percent recidivism within five years for a batterers intervention program based on Nonviolent Communication, and contrasted this with a recidivism rate of 40 percent within five years for a batterers intervention program based on the Duluth Model as reported by the Domestic Abuse Intervention Project.

Criticism
Criticism of the Duluth Model has centered on the program's sexist insistence that men are perpetrators who are violent because they have been socialized in a patriarchy that condones male violence, and that women are victims who are violent only in self-defense. Some critics argue that "programs based on the Duluth Model may ignore research linking domestic violence to substance abuse and psychological problems, such as attachment disorders, traced to childhood abuse or neglect, or the absence of a history of adequate socialization and training." Others criticize the Duluth Model as being overly confrontational rather than therapeutic, focusing solely on changing the abuser's actions and attitudes rather than dealing with underlying emotional and psychological issues. Donald Dutton, a psychology professor at the University of British Columbia who has studied abusive personalities, states: "The Duluth Model was developed by people who didn't understand anything about therapy," and also points out that "lesbian battering is more frequent than heterosexual battering." Philip W. Cook points out that in the case of homosexual domestic violence, the patriarchy is absent: there is no male dominance of women in same-sex relationships, and in fact, female on female abuse is reported more than twice as frequently as male on male abuse. Furthermore, some critics point out that the model ignores the reality that women can be the perpetrators of domestic violence in heterosexual relationships, as well.

Its proponents counter that the Duluth Model is effective and makes best use of scarce resources. However, Ellen Pence herself has written,

The Duluth Model is featured in the documentary Power and Control: Domestic Violence in America with commentary from its authors as well as its main critics, such as Dutton.

See also
 Abusive power and control
 Outline of domestic violence
 Rape shield law
 Relationship counseling
 Relationship education
 Violence Against Women Act

References

Further reading
 
 ; review by Walter S. DeKeseredy in Canadian Journal of Sociology Online November – December 2007
 Muslim Wheel of Domestic Violence—A variation of the Duluth Power and Control Wheel

External links
 Official Site
 Power and Control: Domestic Violence in America—a documentary film and web site focusing on the Duluth Model. Founders Ellen Pence and Michael Paymar are interviewed in the film, with excerpts and transcripts on the web

Domestic violence-related organizations in the United States
Duluth, Minnesota
Feminism and society
Non-profit organizations based in Minnesota
Psychological abuse